Walid Ktila (born 20 July 1985) is a Paralympic wheelchair racer from Tunisia who competes in short and middle distances in the T34 category. He won all 100–800 m events at the 2013, 2015 and 2017 world championships. At the 2012 and 2016 Paralympics he won three gold and one silver medal.

World records
Walid holds two IPC world records in athletics in 100 m and 200 m T34 events.

See also
 Tunisia at the 2013 IPC Athletics World Championships
 Tunisia at the 2012 Summer Paralympics
 Tunisia at the Paralympics

References

External links 

 

1985 births
Living people
Tunisian male athletes
Tunisian wheelchair racers
Male wheelchair racers
Paralympic athletes of Tunisia
Paralympic gold medalists for Tunisia
Paralympic silver medalists for Tunisia
Athletes (track and field) at the 2012 Summer Paralympics
Athletes (track and field) at the 2016 Summer Paralympics
Athletes (track and field) at the 2020 Summer Paralympics
Medalists at the 2012 Summer Paralympics
Medalists at the 2016 Summer Paralympics
Medalists at the 2020 Summer Paralympics
World record holders in Paralympic athletics
World Para Athletics Championships winners
Paralympic medalists in athletics (track and field)
21st-century Tunisian people